Parkview Junior/Senior High School is a public secondary school located in the village of Orfordville, Wisconsin. It is the only high school in the Parkview School District and has an enrollment of approximately 300.

History
The former building, designed by Charles Pym, was constructed in 1964. It is now the elementary school. The junior high was added in 1970, after the original building was constructed. In April 2014, voters passed a referendum to spend $17 million to build a new high school and junior high on the site of the former Parkview Elementary, with the elementary students to occupy the former high school and junior high.

Extracurricular activities 
Varsity sports at Parkview include football, cross country, volleyball, wrestling, basketball, poms, cheer leading, show choir, track and field, baseball, softball, and golf. The school competes within the Trailways conference.

Notable alumnus 
Robert Brooks has been a Wisconsin state representative since 2015.

References

External links
 Parkview School District

Public high schools in Wisconsin
Schools in Rock County, Wisconsin
Educational institutions established in 1964
1964 establishments in Wisconsin